The BSP for Bulgaria, or the Coalition for Bulgaria until 2017, is a left-wing electoral alliance in Bulgaria led by the centre-left Bulgarian Socialist Party. A big tent of the democratic socialist left, it is a coalition of communist, left-wing nationalist, green, and social-democratic parties. On European Union politics, a minority of its members hold pro-European views, while the majority hold more Eurosceptic stances.

Members of the coalition

Election results

References

External links
BSP official website

Bulgarian Socialist Party
Left-wing political party alliances
Political party alliances in Bulgaria
Popular fronts
Socialism in Bulgaria